Kaya Peker (born August 2, 1980) is a retired Turkish professional basketball player. He played at the center position.

Professional career
During his club career, Peker first played with the Turkish Super League clubs Pınar Karşıyaka and Efes Pilsen. He then played with the Spanish League club TAU Ceramica. After that, he played with the Turkish club Beşiktaş. He returned to his former team Efes Pilsen, where he played from 2008 to 2010. In the summer of 2010, he signed a contract with the Turkish club Fenerbahçe.

National team career
Peker was also a regular member of the senior Turkish national team.

Personal life
Peker was married to former the Croatian national volleyball team player Vesna Jelić. However, the couple were eventually divorced.

References

External links

 Euroleague.net Profile
 FIBA Profile
 FIBA Europe Profile
 Eurobasket.com Profile
 TBLStat.net Profile
 Spanish League Archive Profile 
 Efesbasket.org - Efes Pilsen S.K. Official website profile

1980 births
Living people
2002 FIBA World Championship players
2006 FIBA World Championship players
Anadolu Efes S.K. players
Beşiktaş men's basketball players
Centers (basketball)
Fenerbahçe men's basketball players
Karşıyaka basketball players
Liga ACB players
Saski Baskonia players
Sportspeople from Ankara
Tofaş S.K. players
Trabzonspor B.K. players
Turkish expatriate basketball people in Spain
Turkish men's basketball players
Türk Telekom B.K. players
21st-century Turkish people